Flores-Figueroa v. United States, 556 U.S. 646 (2009), was a decision by the Supreme Court of the United States, holding that the law enhancing the sentence for identity theft requires proof that an individual knew that the identity card or number he had used belonged to another, actual person. Simply using a Social Security Number is not sufficient connection to another individual.

Background
Ignacio Flores-Figueroa, an illegal alien from Mexico, used a counterfeit Social Security card bearing his real name and a false Social Security number to obtain employment at a steel plant in East Moline, Illinois. Though he did not know it, the number belonged to a real person, a minor. The question in the case was whether workers who use false Social Security and alien registration numbers must know that they belong to a real person to be subject to a two-year sentence extension for "aggravated identity theft."

Specifically, the case hinged on whether the adverb "knowingly" applies only to the verb or also to the object in 18 U.S.C. § 1028A(a)(1) (which defines aggravated identity theft): "Whoever [...] knowingly transfers, possesses, or uses, without lawful authority, a means of identification of another person [...]".

Opinion of the Court
In a unanimous decision delivered by Justice Breyer on May 4, 2009, the Court held that a prosecutor must be able to show that a defendant knew that the identification he used actually belonged to another person.

See also
List of United States Supreme Court cases, volume 556
Mens rea
Morissette v. United States (1952)

References

Further reading

External links
 

United States Supreme Court cases
2009 in United States case law
Social Security lawsuits
Illegal immigration to the United States
United States Supreme Court cases of the Roberts Court
United States identity theft case law
East Moline, Illinois